The O Antiphons (also known as the Great Advent Antiphons or Great Os) are Magnificat antiphons used at Vespers on the last seven days of Advent in Western Christian traditions. They likely date to sixth-century Italy, when Boethius refers to the text in The Consolation of Philosophy. They subsequently became one of the key musical features of the days leading up to Christmas.

The texts are best known in the English-speaking world in their paraphrased form in the hymn "O Come, O Come, Emmanuel".

Sequence
Each text, in the original Latin, begins with the vocative particle "O". Each antiphon is a title of Christ, one of his attributes mentioned in Scripture. They are:
 17 December: O Sapientia (O Wisdom)
 18 December: O Adonai
 19 December: O Radix Jesse (O Root of Jesse)
 20 December: O Clavis David (O Key of David)
 21 December: O Oriens (O Dawn of the East)
 22 December: O Rex Gentium (O King of the Nations)
 23 December: O Emmanuel 

In the Roman rite, the O Antiphons are sung or recited for the Magnificat at Vespers from 17 December to 23 December.

Origin
The antiphon texts are believed to have originated in Italy in or before the sixth century. Boethius's Consolation of Philosophy includes a passage in which Lady Philosophy appears to cite the series:

The underlying reference is to Wisdom 8:1, but the precise phrasing almost certainly refers to O sapientia.

There were many later traditions throughout the Middle Ages surrounding their performance, and Amalarius wrote a detailed commentary on them in the ninth century.

The first letters of the titles, from last to first, appear to form a Latin acrostic, Ero cras, meaning 'Tomorrow, I will be [there]', mirroring the theme of the antiphons. This is formed from the first letter of each title – Emmanuel, Rex, Oriens, Clavis, Radix, Adonai, Sapientia. Such acrostics were popular among early medieval writers, and some scholars have taken this as further evidence for their antiquity, but this view is not universally accepted.

A number of other antiphons were found in various medieval breviaries.

Analysis
Each antiphon has the following structure:
 a Messianic title preceded by "O". Example: "O Wisdom"
 elaboration of the title: "coming forth from the mouth of the Most High, reaching from one end to the other, mightily and sweetly ordering all things"
 the verb "come"
 elaboration of the request to come: "and teach us the way of prudence."

Below is the traditional Latin text of each antiphon, as well as the English text from the Church of England's Common Worship liturgy. 

Each antiphon is a cento of passages from the Bible. In the text of each antiphon below, the passages from the Bible are indicated by underlining, and the quotation in the footnote is from the Vulgate (for Latin passages) or (for English passages) the NRSV unless indicated otherwise.

O Sapientia

O Adonai

O Radix Jesse

O Clavis David

O Oriens

O Rex gentium

O Emmanuel

Other Antiphons

In addition to the seven antiphons above, a number of other O antiphons have been in use over the centuries in different churches: “O Virgo virginum”, "O Gabriel, nuntius cœlorum", "O Thoma Didyme", “O Rex pacifice”, "O Mundi Domina", “O Hierusalem”, "O sancte sanctorum", “O pastor Israel”. The Parisian Rite had 9 antiphons beginning on December 15, and some other churches had 12 antiphons. A feature of these is that most of them were not addressed to the Messiah. And they were independent of each other, unlike the seven O antiphons described above that formed a self-contained group (as can be seen from the acrostic Ero cras).

An English medieval practice was to add an eighth antiphon – O Virgo virginum – on December 23, and move the others back one day, thus beginning the series on 16 December. The acrostic then became Vero cras ("Truly, tomorrow").

Given the English origins of this alternative, it has traditionally been the version used in the Church of England (including Canterbury Cathedral) until recent times, and is the version printed in traditional Church of England liturgical sources including The English Hymnal (1906) and The New English Hymnal (1986). From 2000, however, the Church of England appears to have taken an official step away from English medieval practice towards the more widely spread custom, as Common Worship makes provision for the sevenfold version of the antiphons, and not the eightfold version.

Current practice
In the Catholic Church, the seven standard O antiphons continue to serve as Magnificat antiphons at Vespers from 17 to 23 December. Since the liturgical reforms following Vatican II, they are also used as the Alleluia verses for Mass in the Ordinary Form on the same days. For the Alleluia verses, the Lectionary moves O Emmanuel to the 21st, uses Rex Gentium on both the 22nd and 23rd, and places O Oriens on the morning of the 24th, but the traditional ordering from the 17th through the 23rd is also permitted.

The Catholic personal ordinariates follow the practice for days from the 17th to the 23rd (Magnificat antiphon at Evensong and Alleluia Verse at Mass, either in the traditional order as indicated in Divine Worship: The Missal or in the order indicated in the Lectionary, but in addition also use O Virgo virginum on the morning of 24 December, both as the Benedictus antiphon at morning prayer and as the Alleluia verse at Mass. 

Some Anglican churches, such as the Church of England, use the O Antiphons at evensong; often according to medieval English usage, beginning on 16 December. 

Use of the O Antiphons also occurs in many Lutheran churches. For example, an English translation of "The Great O Antiphons" appears with the hymn O Come, O Come, Emmanuel in Lutheran Service Book . In the Book of Common Worship published by the Presbyterian Church (USA), the antiphons can be read as a praise litany at Morning or Evening Prayer.

Musical settings

 Carlo Gesualdo, Ô Oriens (1603).
 Jean-Baptiste Geoffroy, Les Antiennes Ô de l'Avent, with basso continuo.
 Marc-Antoine Charpentier, 7 Antiennes Ô, H 36–43, completed in the early 1690s.
 Louis Nicolas Clérambault, 7 Antiennes Ô C.221–227 (1700). 
 , 7 Antiennes Ô (1766). 
 Ralph Vaughan Williams, plainsong setting in English, published in The English Hymnal.
 Herman Strategier, Dutch composer and organist, Cantica pro tempore natali (1953). 
 Arvo Pärt, Estonian composer, a German translation Sieben Magnificat-Antiphonen für gemischten Chor a cappella.
 Bob Chilcott, British composer, Advent Antiphons, in Latin, for unaccompanied SSAATTBB.
 Paweł Łukaszewski, Polish composer, (1995–1999).
 Peter Hallock, American composer of music in the Episcopalian and Anglican traditions, two settings, 1986 and 1989.
 Healey Willan, Anglo-Canadian composer, whose setting is in use throughout the Anglican Communion.
 James MacMillan, Scottish composer, has set to music an English paraphrase of the antiphon O Oriens ('O Radiant Dawn') as part of his Strathclyde Motets. The setting borrows harmony from Thomas Tallis's motet O nata lux.

See also
Christ I

Media

References

External links

 
 
 
 

Catholic liturgy
Latin-language Christian hymns
Advent songs